Dibru College was established in 1963 situated at Boiragimoth, the heart of Dibrugarh city. Today the college provides major courses altogether in twelve out of twenty one subjects. The Government of India has identified the college as a Biotechnology hub too. The college has received a grant from the Department of Science and Technology. Recently the college has also received a grant from the Government of Assam for excursion, magazine and games & sports developments. The
Dibru College Central Library is the heart of the institution.The library is a two storied building with 594.57 sq feet area. It is automated through SOUL3.0 and the Digital Library is developed with DSpace software. It has 44200 books and 1,35,000 are belonging to it. The library has 12 numbers of Print Journals and 6200 e-journal, 21 magazines and 12 newspapers of English Hindi, Assamese languages .I has been modernised with Kindle Digital Reading as well as Relax Reading Room facilities. It touches the needs of the local people through Remote Access Service and Documents Delivery Services.The uniqueness of the library is Readers'Club Sitting and publication of peer reviewed annual journal "GRANTHAKUTI". The library is organised National Librarians'Day, World Books and Copyright Day and is awarded the Best Reader Award and Best E-resources User Award annually.

Academics 

The college offers the two years Higher Secondary Course and Three years Degree Course of study in three streams Arts, Science and Commerce.

Educational departments

  English Department
  Assamese Department
  Bengali Department
 Sanskrit Department
 Education Department
 Economics Department
 Commerce Department
 History Department
 Political Science Department
 Anthropology Department
 Sociology Department 
 Geology Department
 Philosophy Department
 Hindi Department
 Mathematics Department
 Botany Department
 Zoology Department
 Chemistry Department
 Physics Department
 Computer Science Department
 Biotechnology Department
 Statistical Science Department

References

External links
Dibru College
College Central Library

Colleges in Assam
Dibrugarh
Colleges affiliated to Dibrugarh University
1963 establishments in Assam
Educational institutions established in 1963